Sonny Leonard  (June 19, 1943 – January 10, 2021) was an American businessman and the CEO of   Sonny's Automotive Racing, a company he founded in January 1969. Leonard was known for designing and building large engine displacement drag racing V8 engines. Leonard's engines have won numerous national and global records and championships on land and sea.

Achievements (selection)
 , big block engine
 , big block engine
 , big block engine
 , hemispherical combustion chamber engine
 , Ford Hemi big block

History
After turning his hobby into a business, Sonny Leonard opened a garage in 1968 in a  building in Madison Heights, Virginia. In 1987, Leonard made history with Bill Kuhlmann, who drove Sonny's 615 cubic inch engine to the first speed of 200 mph in history with a full-bodied car. In 2013 Sonny Leonard became a partner for the 2013 season in the X-treme Drag Racing League (X-DRL). Sonnys Racing Engines celebrated its 50th anniversary in 2018. In 2019 Sonny Leonard built a second engine to raise funds for Victory Junction. In the same year he led John Montecalvo to the PDRA Pro Stock Championship. Sonny Leonard died on Sunday, January 10, 2021.

References

1943 births
2021 deaths
Engine manufacturers of the United States
V8 engines